Pont Ceri is a small village in the  community of Llandyfriog, Ceredigion, Wales, located where the Afon Ceri flows into the River Teifi,  northwest of Newcastle Emlyn. Pont Ceri is represented in the Senedd by Elin Jones (Plaid Cymru) and the is part of the Ceredigion constituency in the House of Commons.

References

See also
List of localities in Wales by population

Villages in Ceredigion